This is a list of civil parishes in the County of London, excluding the City of London, on the night of the United Kingdom census, 1891. The total population of this area was 4,194,413.

There were 196 civil parishes in the county at large on this date, of which 80 were entirely outside the City, 112 were entirely within the City, and four were partly within the City.

Notes

References

1891 United Kingdom census
1891 in London
Civil parishes 1801
County of London